Back Where I Belong is the first solo album by English rock and roll singer Tony Martin. It was recorded after Martin was briefly replaced in Black Sabbath by Ronnie James Dio in the early nineties, and was released in 1992. When recording demos for the album, Martin played all the instruments himself; for the finished product, however, a variety of musicians were involved. On this album, the singer covered "Jerusalem", which originally appeared on Tyr, a Black Sabbath album on which Martin sang.

Track listing

Band members 
 Tony Martin – guitars (2, 3, 4 (solo), 5, 6, 7, 8, 9, 10, 11 (acoustic))
 Brian May – guitars (3)
 Paul Wright – guitars (2 (solo), 7, 9, 10)
 Adrian Dawson – guitars (2 (solo), 7 (solo) 9 (solo), 10)
 Carlo Fragnito – guitars (1, 4, 7, 9, 10, 11, 13)
 Richard Cottle – keyboards & saxophone (1 (key+sax), 2, 3, 4, 7, 8, 9, 10, 11)
 Geoff Nicholls – keyboards (5, 6, 12, 13)
 Neil Murray – bass (1, 2, 3, 4, 7, 10, 11, 13)
 Laurence Cottle – bass (5, 6, 8, 9)
 Zak Starkey – drums (2, 3, 8, 9, 10, 11)
 Nigel Glockler – drums (1, 4, 6, 7, 13)

References 

Tony Martin (British singer) albums
1992 debut albums